Meiracyllium, abbreviated as Mrclm in horticultural trade, is a genus of orchids and the sole genus of the subtribe Meiracyllinae. The genus was erected by Heinrich Gustav Reichenbach. It is native to Mexico and Central America.

Species
At present (June 2014), two species are recognized:

References

External links

IOSPE orchid photos, Meiracyllium trinasutum 

Laeliinae
Laeliinae genera